Chéri is a 2009 romantic comedy-drama film directed by Stephen Frears from a screenplay by Christopher Hampton, based on the 1920 novel of the same name and its 1926 sequel The Last of Chéri by French author Colette. It stars Michelle Pfeiffer and Rupert Friend. The film premiered at the 59th Berlin International Film Festival.

Plot
Set in 1900s Belle Époque Paris, Chéri tells the story of an affair between a wealthy, middle-aged retired courtesan, Léa, and Fred, nicknamed Cheri ("Dear" or "Darling"), the flamboyant spoiled, neglected 19-year-old only son of another even wealthier courtesan. A famous beauty, Léa has been successful at extracting large sums of money from her up-scale clients, never falling in love with any of them.

At first Léa takes Chéri off her "friend" (and former rival) Charlotte's hands as a favor, as his dissipated lifestyle is irritating to Charlotte and unhealthy for Chéri. Although Léa only plans on keeping Chéri around for a short while, their affair turns into a six-year relationship, in which Léa pays for Chéri's expenses, (although he has access to considerable wealth from his mother) and Chéri wears Léa's silk pajamas and pearls. Although they satisfy each other both sexually and emotionally, the two convince themselves that their affair is casual, but they are the only real friend the other has. Her status as a former prostitute and his as the son of one make them outsiders who can only be fully honest and relaxed together.

Léa learns Chéri's mother has arranged for Chéri to marry the daughter of another courtesan, an innocent barely 18-year-old named Edmée, as Charlotte has decided she wants grandchildren, largely to make up for her years of neglecting Chéri. Although Chéri does not wish to marry Edmée, whom he finds boring, he has no choice in the matter, as he stands to inherit a huge fortune from Charlotte. Léa cheerfully kicks him out of her home, but makes Chéri promise to always be gentle and kind with Edmée, and to try to give her a good life. After Chéri agrees, the two part ways, both putting on an air of breezy unconcern, as much to convince themselves as the rest of the world that their affair had just been for amusement.

Léa does not attend the wedding, and Chéri and Edmée leave for their honeymoon. It is only after Chéri is on the train to Italy for his honeymoon that both he and Léa realise they are in love with each other. Chéri consummates his marriage with Edmée, but their lovemaking is perfunctory, and even though Edmée is in love with her husband, Chéri can't summon any emotion for her. Léa visits Charlotte one last time before running off on vacation, making up a story in which she is involved with another suitor, when in fact the only man Léa beds while on vacation is a young bodybuilder whom she has no feelings for and regards as a one-night stand.

Meanwhile, Edmée accuses Chéri of not caring about her, and says all he ever does is think of Léa, "that old woman". While out on the town with a friend, Chéri tries opium and cocaine, and on his way back he notices that Léa's apartment is no longer empty and she has returned home. Comforted by the fact that Léa has returned, Chéri runs home to Edmée where he makes love to her properly and kindly, thinking that he can now live in peace with Edmée, juggling both women. He sends Charlotte the next day to investigate Léa's homelife, whereupon Léa claims she is madly in love with her new "suitor", and Charlotte tells her that Chéri and Edmée are likewise madly in love and happier than ever. That night, jealous and wanting to confront Léa about her new suitor, Chéri breaks into her home and admits he loves her. They make love with all the pent up passion they have been suppressing for the sake of others, and plan on running away together.

In the morning, however, Chéri notices the wrinkles on Léa's face in the harsh light of day, and she sees his doubt. She apologizes to Chéri for "ruining him" and making life too easy on him when they first began their affair. Léa tells Chéri to go back to Edmée, for their age difference would always prevent a true relationship blossoming between them. Tentatively, Chéri leaves as Léa watches, breathlessly hoping he will turn back. Both crestfallen and elated by a new sense of freedom, he walks on, as Léa stares into her mirror at her aging face.

The narrator reflects on the injustice of fate, that Léa was born two decades before her only true love, Chéri. The narrator also reveals that, while he went through World War 1 without a scratch, Chéri later realises that Léa was the only woman he could ever love, and he commits suicide.

Cast

Release
Chéri premiered in the main competition section of the 59th Berlin International Film Festival. The film was released theatrically in France on 8 April 2009 by Pathé Distribution and in the United Kingdom on 8 May 2009 by Pathé's distribution partner Warner Bros. Entertainment UK, marking the first film released under the then-recent theatrical distribution deal between the two companies.

The film was released on DVD in the United Kingdom on 21 September 2009 by 20th Century Fox Home Entertainment. As of 2021, Warner Bros. Home Entertainment is currently re-releasing Pathé's film library in the United Kingdom.

Reception
On the review aggregator website Rotten Tomatoes, the film holds an approval rating of 50% based on 140 reviews, with an average rating of 5.7/10. The website's critics consensus reads, "A too-short script and a romance lacking in heat detracts from an otherwise haughty charmer." Metacritic, which uses a weighted average, assigned the film a score of 63 out of 100, based on 27 critics, indicating "generally favorable reviews".

Stephen Dalton of The Times reviewed the film favourably, describing Hampton's screenplay as a "steady flow of dry quips and acerbic one-liners" and Pfeiffer's performance as "magnetic and subtle, her worldly nonchalance a mask for vulnerability and heartache."

Roger Ebert of the Chicago Sun-Times wrote that it was "fascinating to observe how Pfeiffer controls her face and voice during times of painful hurt."

Kenneth Turan of the Los Angeles Times praised the "wordless scenes that catch Léa unawares, with the camera alone seeing the despair and regret that she hides from the world. It's the kind of refined, delicate acting Pfeiffer does so well, and it's a further reminder of how much we've missed her since she's been away."

References

External links
 
 
 
 
 

2009 films
2009 romantic comedy-drama films
2000s British films
2000s English-language films
2000s French films
2000s German films
2000s historical comedy-drama films
2000s historical romance films
Belle Époque
British historical comedy-drama films
British historical romance films
British romantic comedy-drama films
English-language French films
English-language German films
Films directed by Stephen Frears
Films based on French novels
Films based on multiple works of a series
Films based on romance novels
Films based on works by Colette
Films scored by Alexandre Desplat
Films set in the 1900s
Films set in Paris
Films shot at Shepperton Studios
Films shot in Cologne
Films shot in Paris
French historical comedy-drama films
French historical romance films
French romantic comedy-drama films
German historical comedy-drama films
German historical romance films
German romantic comedy-drama films
Pathé films
UK Film Council films